Hans S. Witsenhausen (6 May 1930 in Frankfurt/Main, Germany - 19 November 2016 in New York City, New York) is notable for his work in the fields of control and information theory, and their intersection. He has many foundational results including the intrinsic model in stochastic decentralized control, the Witsenhausen counterexample, his work on Turán graph, and the various notions of common information in information theory.

He received the I.C.M.E. degree in electrical engineering in 1953 and the degree of Licence en Sciences in mathematical physics in 1956, both from the Universite Libre de Bruxelles, Brussels, Belgium. He received the S.M. and Ph.D. degrees in electrical engineering from the Massachusetts Institute of Technology, Cambridge, in 1964 and 1966, respectively From 1957 to 1959 he was engaged in problem analysis and programming at the European Computation Center, Brussels. From 1960 to 1963 he was a Senior Engineer at the Research and Computation Division of Electronic Associates, inc., Princeton, N.J., where he worked on analog and hybrid computer techniques and on systems analysis problems. From 1963 to 1965 he was associated with the Electronic Systems Laboratory and the Lincoln Laboratory at MIT. During 1965–1966 he was a fellow of the Fannie and John Hertz Foundation.

This biography appears in his paper.

References

External links 

1930 births
American computer scientists
German computer scientists
2016 deaths
MIT Lincoln Laboratory people
Jewish engineers
20th-century German Jews